The 2015 South American Under-15 Football Championship was the seventh edition of the South American Under-15 Football Championship, the biennial international youth football championship organised by the CONMEBOL for the men's under-15 national teams of South America. The tournament was held in the cities of Montería and Valledupar, Colombia between 21 November and 6 December 2015.

Teams
All ten CONMEBOL member national teams entered the tournament.

Venues
CONMEBOL appointed Colombia as the host country during its 65th Ordinary Congress on 3 March 2015. The tournament was played in Estadio Municipal de Montería, Montería and Estadio Armando Maestre Pavajeau, Valledupar.

Squads
Each team had to submit a squad of 22 players (three of whom must be goalkeepers) until 30 October 2015. Players born on or after 1 January 2000 are eligible to compete in the tournament.

First stage
The draw of the tournament was held on 16 October 2015 during the CONMEBOL Executive Committee meeting at the Hyatt Hotel in Santiago, Chile. The ten teams were drawn into two groups of five teams. Each group contained one team from each of the five "pairing pots": Colombia–Chile, Argentina–Brazil, Paraguay–Uruguay, Ecuador–Peru, Bolivia–Venezuela. The schedule of the tournament was announced on 28 October 2015.

The top two teams of each group advanced to the final stage.

All times local, COT (UTC−5).

Group A

Group B

Final stage

Bracket

Semi-finals

Third place match

Final

Goalscorers
7 goals
 Vitinho

6 goals
 Vinícius Jr.

5 goals

 Carlos Bergottini
 Facundo Torres
 José Barragán

4 goals

 Facundo Colidio
 Jhon García
 Rafael Tapia
 Josue Quiñónez

3 goals

 Paulinho
 Deiber Caicedo

2 goals

 Agustín Almendra
 Gonzalo Córdoba
 Benjamín Garré
 Agustín Obando
 Alan
 Vinicius
 Patricio Romero
 Zederiv Vega
 Andrés Parrales
 Cristian Tobar
 Santiago Rodríguez

1 goal

 Facundo Fernández
 Román Vildoso
 Luis Melgar
 Nicolás Suárez
 Cristian
 Wilson Martínez
 Thomas Gutiérrez
 Maikel Hernández
 Edwin López
 Robert Mejía
 Joseph Espinoza
 William Piguave
 Ángel Bóveda
 Rodrigo González
 Yair Méndez
 Marcelo Rolón
 José Bolívar
 Frank Gallardo
 Renzo Huacho
 Luis Valverde
 Owen Falconis
 Ezequiel Mechoso
 Gonzalo Napoli
 José Neris
 Rommell Ibarra

Own goals
 Julio Chamorro (playing against Venezuela)

References

External links
Sudamericano Masculino Sub-15 Colombia 2015, CONMEBOL.com

2015
International association football competitions hosted by Colombia
Under-15 Football Championship
2015 in Colombian football
2015 in youth association football